Provincial Road 367 (PR 367) is in the Canadian province of Manitoba.

Route description 
Provincial Road 367 is an east-west route that runs from PTH 10 near Garland to PTH 83 near San Clara. 

It is the main east-west route through Duck Mountain Provincial Park. It is mainly a gravel road as it passes through the park, and is paved on either side of the park gates, with paved sections from PTH 83 to PR 594 south on the west side, and from the park's east gate to PTH 10 on the east side.

References

External links 
Manitoba Official Map - West Central

367